The Bollobás–Riordan polynomial can mean a 3-variable invariant polynomial of graphs on orientable surfaces, or a more general 4-variable invariant of ribbon graphs, generalizing the Tutte polynomial.

History

Formal definition
The 3-variable Bollobás–Riordan polynomial of a graph  is given by

,

where the sum runs over all the spanning subgraphs  and 

See also
Graph invariant

References

Polynomials